The Asociación Deportiva Mexicana de Básquetbol (ADEMEBA) is the governing body of basketball in Mexico. It was established in 2008.

ADEMEBA is recognized by FIBA and has taken the place of the FMB as the national basketball organization for Mexico.

The organization is currently directed by Modesto Robledo.

See also
Liga Nacional de Baloncesto Profesional
Federación Mexicana de Baloncesto

References

External links

Mexico
Basketball in Mexico
Mex
2008 establishments in Mexico
Basketball
Sports organizations established in 2008